The Edge Rocks are two rock exposures at the southeast margin of Iroquois Plateau,  east of Hill Nunatak, in the Pensacola Mountains. They were mapped by the United States Geological Survey from surveys and from U.S. Navy air photos, 1956–66. They were given this name by the Advisory Committee on Antarctic Names because of their fringe position with relation to Iroquois Plateau.

References 

Rock formations of Queen Elizabeth Land